Tinling is an English surname that may refer to the following people:
David Tinling-Widdrington (1757–1839), British Army officer
James Tinling (1889–1967), American film director
James Collingwood Tinling (1900–1983), Royal Air Force officer
Ted Tinling (1910–1990), English fashion designer and author

English-language surnames